IBC Root Beer is an American brand of root beer now owned by Keurig Dr Pepper. It was originally owned by IBC until it went out of business.

Independent Breweries Company 
The Independent Breweries Company is a defunct syndicate founded in St. Louis, Missouri, by the combination of Griesediecks' National Brewery, Columbia (Alpen Brau), the Gast brewery in Baden, A.B.C., and Wagner Brewing Company. This combination was ill fated due to high overhead with too many executives and low profits forcing IBC into receivership. The IBC Root Beer was the main survivor of the syndicate.

Root beer 

IBC Root Beer was founded in 1919 by the Griesedieck family as the Independent Breweries Company in St. Louis, Missouri. Root beer found a market as a legal beverage during the era of Prohibition. The Independent Breweries Company closed, but the trademark was purchased by the Kranzberg family, which operated the Northwestern Bottling Company. In the late 1930s, it was sold to the National Bottling Company, owned by the Shucart family. Popularity and distribution declined after World War II.

In 1976, the IBC trademark was sold to Taylor Beverages, which was then sold to the Seven-Up Company in 1980. After Dr Pepper and 7 Up merged in 1986, distribution of IBC spread across the United States. Dr Pepper/Seven Up was acquired by Cadbury Schweppes in 1995.

IBC was subsequently organized within the Cadbury Schweppes Americas Beverages unit of Cadbury Schweppes, before being spun off into Dr Pepper Snapple Group in 2008.

In July 2016, IBC reformulated its beverages, using cane sugar in place of high-fructose corn syrup. The bottles are now distributed in four-bottle packs (instead of the original six), and no longer have the IBC logo formed into the bottle itself, but rather printed on a plain brown bottle.  This change has also resulted in increase in average price per bottle.

Flavors

Current 
In 2020:
 IBC Root Beer
 IBC Diet Root Beer
 IBC Cream Soda
 IBC Black Cherry
 IBC Cherry Limeade
 IBC coconut lime

Former 
 IBC Tangerine Cream Soda
 IBC Cherry Cola
 IBC Strawberries and Cream
 IBC Berries and Cream
 IBC Birch Beer
 IBC Peach Cream Soda

See also
 Fitz's, another St. Louis root beer

References

External links 
 
GB Beer, Our Story

American soft drinks
Cuisine of St. Louis
Keurig Dr Pepper brands
Products introduced in 1919
Root beer